The Vox Theatre is an event space located in Rosedale, Kansas.

The Vox Theatre

History 
The Vox Theatre opened as the Rosedale Theatre on December 20, 1922 as a silent movie theater. The Rosedale Theatre was originally owned by T.L. Ricksecker and cost $30,000 to construct. The theater is located at 1405 Southwest Boulevard in the Rosedale neighborhood of Kansas City, Kansas.(1)  Originally it was located across the street from Whitmore School. The Whitmore School was razed in 1973 and replaced by Whitmore Park. 

In the early 1940s, the name of the theatre was changed to the Vox Theatre and the venue was playing movies with sound.(2)

By the early 1960s, the trend of small intimate theatres gave way to the large drive-in theatres and the Vox Theatre was sold to Westport Heating and Cooling which used the building to manufacture sheet metal ductwork.  Later, the space housed a workshop for restoring antique automobiles.

In January 2009, Alistair Tutton purchased the building and brought back the name the Vox Theatre.  Tutton remodeled the space to be used for his photography studio and an event space. With the space being  with  ceilings the ability to transform the space into many different uses was created.

Remodeled 
During the remodel, the current owner tried to keep as much of the original structure as possible.  The original pressed tin ceiling was preserved.  The projection room was converted to office space which houses, Alistair Tutton Photography, Vox Theatre Event Space and Springboard Creative.  Although, the balcony no longer exists, the archways that lead to the balcony are still present.  The original stage floor has also been preserved.  Stage curtains were purchased from a local high school and along with the refurbished stage valance lighting the theatre look was complete.

Nearby Sites of Interest 
 Rosedale Arch - a site dedicated to Rosedale residents serving in World War 1
 Sauer Castle - legendary haunted house
 Boulevard Drive-In - a drive-in theater built in 1950 that still show movies on the big screen on the weekend every summer
 University of Kansas School of Medicine, leading academic hospital in [Rosedale, Kansas]
 Oklahoma Joe's Barbecue, famous barbecue restaurant Kansas City-style barbecue

References 
(1) The Winding Valley and The Craggy Hillside: A History of the City of Rosedale, Kansas by Margaret Landis, Copyright 1976, ASIN B0006CRK64.
(2) The 50s In Wyandotte County by Murrel Bland, Copyright 2005,

External links
 Unified Government of Wyandotte County/Kansas City, Kansas
 Kansas City, KS/Wyandotte County Convention and Visitors Bureau
 Kansas City, Kansas Public Libraries
 Boulevard Drive-In
 Rosedale Development Association
 Rosedale Business Stakeholders Association
 Whitmore School

 Vox Theatre Event Space
 Alistair Tutton Photography
 Springboard Creative

Theatres in Kansas
Buildings and structures in Kansas City, Kansas